Amanda Lang (born 31 October 1970) is a Canadian business journalist, currently employed by BNN Bloomberg. Previously, she was the host of Bloomberg North on Bloomberg TV Canada. Lang was formerly senior business correspondent for CBC News, where she anchored The Exchange with Amanda Lang daily on CBC News Network. Prior to her work with CBC, she worked as a print journalist for Canadian national newspapers and was an anchor for CNNfn and BNN.

Early life
Lang's father is Otto Lang, a Liberal party MP and federal cabinet member during the 1960s and 1970s.  Lang's stepfather, Donald Stovel Macdonald, was also a federal Liberal Cabinet member. Lang has an identical twin sister, Adrian.

She attended St Mary's Academy, a private Catholic girls' school in Winnipeg, Manitoba and later studied architecture at the University of Manitoba.

Journalism career
Lang began her journalism career in print at The Globe and Mail in the InfoGlobe unit.

She was later the New York correspondent for the National Post (after it acquired the Financial Post).

Switch to television
She got her start in television as an anchor and reporter with CNN in New York City where she reported from the New York Stock Exchange for American Morning, and anchored programs on CNN's then-financial network, CNNfn.

Moving back to Canada, she became an anchor for Business News Network and was host of both SqueezePlay and The Commodities Report.

Lang left SqueezePlay and BNN in July 2009.

CBC
Starting on 26 October 2009, Lang and Kevin O'Leary began anchoring The Lang & O'Leary Exchange, a new business program on CBC News Network airing weekdays (as of 1 March 2010) at 7 pm Eastern Time, on which she has interviewed people such as Brian Mulroney, former prime minister of Canada.

Her book, The Power of Why, came out in 2012. Already touted as Peter Mansbridge's successor on The National, the 42-year-old Lang made Toronto Life'''s 2012 '50 Most Influential People in Toronto' annual list.

On 13 October 2015, CBC announced Lang was leaving the broadcaster effective 16 October for what was described as "a new opportunity outside the CBC in television."

 Bloomberg 
Lang became a host of Bloomberg TV Canada's Bloomberg North in early-2016. Following the September 2017 winddown of the network, Bell Media hired Lang once again for Business News Network (which had announced that it would become a co-branded franchise of Bloomberg Television, BNN Bloomberg), where she now co-hosts Bloomberg Markets as part of a co-production arrangement for the program.

Conflict of interest controversies

NDP
In 2011, Lang hosted a panel on CBC's The National where she was assigned to determine the credibility of then NDP leader Jack Layton's election platform. It was not disclosed to the viewing audience that Lang's brother was, at the time, running against Layton for the Liberal Party in the riding of Toronto—Danforth. CBC's Ombudsman ruled in July 2011 that "it was not possible to compartmentalize Lang's reporting on NDP policy from Layton's qualities as a leader and credentials to be supported as a candidate. Any of her campaign reporting even indirectly intersecting with the Liberals or NDP could have been perceived as conflicted."

Manulife and Sun Life
In December 2014, media website Canadaland presented evidence that earlier that year Lang had provided favorable CBC coverage to two companies, Manulife and Sun Life, without disclosing to viewers that each company had recently paid her for speaking engagements.

Royal Bank of Canada
In January 2015, Canadaland ran stories noting that Lang participated in the coverage of the Royal Bank of Canada during its temporary foreign worker program scandal, including interviewing the then-CEO of the bank Gord Nixon, while having done speaking engagements at RBC sponsored events, promoting her own book, which featured a back cover endorsement from Nixon without disclosing she was in a relationship with a board member of the bank.

In the wake of the RBC stories, George Monbiot, a columnist for The Guardian, wrote on 20 January 2015, "It amazes me that [Lang] remains employed by CBC." John Doyle, a columnist for the Toronto The Globe and Mail, wrote on 23 January "It's time for Lang to get down off her high horse and go away. This is about the CBC's reputation, not hers, which is already in tatters."

On 22 January 2015, the CBC announced it had banned on-air talent from accepting paid speaking engagements. Later that day, Lang conceded in a piece in The Globe and Mail that she should have made on-air disclosures about her connection to RBC and stated that she agreed with the speaking engagement ban.

On 5 March 2015, the CBC announced an internal report conducted by one of its own news employees had determined Lang met its journalistic standards. However, in a blog post and in a letter to CBC viewers who complained about Lang's alleged RBC conflicts of interest, CBC News General Manager Jennifer McGuire stated that the CBC did not disclose the majority of its report on Lang to the public, including the parts concerning Lang's alleged conflicts of interest regarding her personal life: "Let me state out front that only a small portion of that review was made public: analysis of the content that we broadcast and published. Other sections which cover the equally important questions about conflict of interest were not released because of obligations we have to keep them confidential ... Any discipline carried out in accordance with that collective agreement is also confidential."

Barrick Gold
Toronto's NOW Magazine reported on 16 January 2015, that Lang "came to the defence" of Barrick Gold, a mining company that had employed her ex-husband, in an on-air CBC segment.

Publications
 The Power of Why (2012)
 The Beauty of Discomfort: How What We Avoid Is What We Need'' (2017)

References

1970 births
Living people
Canadian television journalists
Writers from Ottawa
Writers from Toronto
University of Manitoba alumni
Canadian television talk show hosts
The Globe and Mail people
CBC Television people
Journalistic scandals
Journalists from Toronto
Canadian architects
Canadian women television journalists
Canadian business and financial journalists
Women in finance
Canadian business writers
Canadian twins
Women business and financial journalists
Women business writers
21st-century Canadian women writers
21st-century Canadian non-fiction writers
21st-century Canadian journalists